The 2019–20 season was Sheffield United's 131st season in their history and the first season back in the Premier League since the 2006–07 season after gaining promotion for finishing in the second place in the EFL Championship last season. Along with the Premier League, the club also competed in the FA Cup and EFL Cup. The season covered the period from 1 July 2019 to 26 July 2020.

The season was widely considered one of the best in the history of Sheffield United after finishing 9th and defying all the odds. Before the start of the season, the Blades were tipped to be relegated by most critics and pundits in the Premier League community. Manager Chris Wilder's 5-3-2 'overlapping centre-backs' was praised by many after it dragged a group of relatively below standard players to a top half Premier League finish.

Kits

Squad

Appearances and goals

|-
! colspan=14 style=background:#DCDCDC; text-align:center| Goalkeepers

 

|-
! colspan=14 style=background:#DCDCDC; text-align:center| Defenders

|-
! colspan=14 style=background:#DCDCDC; text-align:center| Midfielders

|-
! colspan=14 style=background:#DCDCDC; text-align:center| Forwards

|-
!colspan=14|Player(s) out on loan:

|-
!colspan=14|Players who left the club:

|}

Goals

Transfers

Transfers in

Loans in

Loans out

Transfers out

Pre-season
The Blades announced their pre-season schedule in June 2019.

Competitions

Premier League

League table

Results summary

Results by matchday

Matches
On 13 June 2019, the Premier League fixtures were announced.

FA Cup

The third round draw was made live on BBC Two from Etihad Stadium, Micah Richards and Tony Adams conducted the draw. The fourth round draw was made by Alex Scott and David O'Leary on Monday, 6 January. The draw for the fifth round was made on 27 January 2020, live on The One Show.

EFL Cup

The second round draw was made on 13 August 2019 following the conclusion of all but one first round matches. The third round draw was confirmed on 28 August 2019, live on Sky Sports.

References

Sheffield United F.C. seasons
Sheffield United